József Farkas was a male Hungarian international table tennis player.

He won two silver medals at the 1950 World Table Tennis Championships and 1951 World Table Tennis Championships in the men's team events.

See also
 List of table tennis players
 List of World Table Tennis Championships medalists

References

Hungarian male table tennis players
World Table Tennis Championships medalists